David Kriegel (born in 1969 in New York) is a retired American actor.

Career
He played supporting roles in such films as Alive, Speed and Leaving Las Vegas. At the time of Speed’s 20th anniversary Kriegel owned a unique children’s dance studio with his wife in Studio City. In Quest of the Delta Knights he played Leonardo da Vinci.

Filmography
 Slumber Party Massacre 3 (1990)
 Alive as Gustavo Zerbino (1993)
 Sexual Response (1992)
 Quest of the Delta Knights as Leonardo da Vinci (1993)
 Speed (1994)
 Sleep with Me (1994)
 Leaving Las Vegas as hotel manager(1995)

References

1969 births

Living people